What Doesn't Kill Me is the second studio album by New Zealand urban rapper Young Sid. It features the singles "Never Waste a Day" and "Stuck in a Box" which features New Zealand soul singer Stan Walker. The Album was released on 3 May 2010 and since then has debuted on the RIANZ album charts on 10 May 2010 at number 16. It later peaked at number 11. It then slipped off the charts after 8 weeks in the top 40. The title alludes to the Nietzsche quote.

Critical reception
Sir-Vere of Rip It Up awarded What Doesn't Kill Me... four and a half out of five stars, and praised its lyrical content and non-radio friendly "real music".

Track listing

Deluxe album bonus tracks
 "As The World Turns" (Produced by Twice As Nice)
 "You Can Make It" feat. Mr Sicc (Produced by Twice As Nice)
 "It's Murder" (Produced by Shuko)
 "What Would You Do" feat. Tyree (Produced by Twice As Nice)
 "Hard Work" (Produced by Juse)

Awards and nominations

2010 New Zealand Music Awards
 2010 Hip-Hop Album of the Year – Nominated

2010 Māori Music Awards
2010 Māori Urban Album of the Year – Won

References

2010 albums
Young Sid albums
Albums produced by Emile Haynie